is a Japanese wrestler. He competed in the men's Greco-Roman 68 kg at the 1976 Summer Olympics.

References

External links
 

1948 births
Living people
Japanese male sport wrestlers
Olympic wrestlers of Japan
Wrestlers at the 1976 Summer Olympics
Sportspeople from Hiroshima
Wrestlers at the 1974 Asian Games
Asian Games competitors for Japan
20th-century Japanese people
21st-century Japanese people